Stützengrün is a community in the district of Erzgebirgskreis, Saxony, Germany.

Geography

Location 
Stützengrün is in the Ore Mountains right on the border with the Vogtland. In Stützengrün is found the Weißbach (stream), which flows directly into the Eibenstock Reservoir.

Geology 
The community lies on a hilly plateau of Eibenstock tourmaline-granite and stretches from a height of 570 up to 680 metres above sea level.

Constituent communities 
As well as the namesake community of Stützengrün, the municipal area also includes the former municipalities of Hundshübel and Lichtenau.

History 
From 1952 to 1990, Stützengrün was part of the Bezirk Karl-Marx-Stadt of East Germany.

Development of population figures (31 December):

 Source as of 1998: Statistisches Landesamt des Freistaates Sachsen

Politics 

At the mayoral election on 31 August 2014, Volkmar Viehweg was elected. He succeeded Birgit Reichel (CDU), who had been mayor for 14 years.

Culture and sightseeing 

Right on Bundesstraße 169, which runs through the community, is the Bauernbarockkirche (“Baroque Farmers’ Church”), built in 1701 and now a protected monument, with its carved altar and a 130-year-old Jehmlich organ.

A further attraction in the community is the 795-m-high Kuhberg (“Cow Mountain”) with the Prinz-Georg-Turm (tower) which affords an unrivalled view of the neighbouring communities. Moreover, the Bergwiesenerlebnispfad (“Mountain Meadow Experience Path”), which features indigenous vegetation and Scottish Highland cattle, makes for an inviting walk.

Economy and infrastructure

Transport 
Stützengrün lies on Bundesstraße 169.  Until the 1970s, the community was connected to the railway by the narrow-gauge line that ran from Wilkau-Haßlau to Carlsfeld. In 1997, the stretch to Schönheide was rebuilt and since then has been run as a museum railway.

Established businesses 

 Brush industry
 Small and medium-sized businesses
 Sporadic agriculture 
 Commercial-industrial area on the B 169

Education 
The elementary school at Stützengrün on Schulstraße (“School Street”) serves the local schooling needs.

References

See also

Erzgebirgskreis